is a fictional character jointly owned by Capcom and Moto Kikaku. Although primarily known as a game character, Hiryu (飛竜, "Flying Dragon") debuted in 1988 as the protagonist of a Japan-exclusive manga titled Strider Hiryu, published by Kadokawa Shoten.

Hiryu made his first video game appearance in the arcade game Strider (1989) Since his debut, he has appeared in various video games produced by Capcom, notably in the Marvel vs. Capcom series. Several publications and polls have regarded him as one of the most popular Capcom characters, one of the top ninja characters in video games, or even one of the best heroes in all of gaming.

Character and design
In most versions of the Strider story, "Hiryu" is an elite-class member of a mercenary group of futuristic, high-tech ninja-derived agents known as the Striders, who specialize in various kinds of black ops and wetwork such as espionage, sabotage, and assassinations. The word "Strider", used by the organization to refer to their agents, is said to mean "He who runs across fields" (野を馳せる者), a reference to the group covering operations and specialties all over the world. Hiryu's signature weapon is his "cypher" (a plasma-generating blade with a tonfa-like handle) named Falchion. He also has three Option support robots that he can call in for assistance (Option A is a satellite drone, Option B is a robotic panther, and Option C is a robotic hawk), as well as tools such as the all-terrain climbing instrument "climb sickle". An active Strider agent, all personal data pertaining to Hiryu outside of his codename, such as real name, age, nationality, career and any other background information, are top secret. In fighting games, several of Hiryu's moves are named after various legendary weapons of various lore, including Ame-no-murakumo, Excalibur, Gram, and Vajra.

According to Kouichi Yotsui, the planner of the original Strider coin-op game, the Strider Hiryu franchise was conceived as a multimedia collaboration between video game company Capcom and manga collective Moto Kikaku, the two companies having previously collaborated on the video game versions of the manga Tenchi wo Kurau. Moto Kikaku produced the manga version, while Capcom developed two separate video game versions, a coin-operated video game and a console version for the NES. All three works share common plot elements, while featuring their differences as well. Because of Moto Kikaku's involvement in the character's creation, their name appears alongside Capcom's in the copyrights byline of the character.

Kouichi Yotsui said it was he who "pushed for a ninja concept" as they were leaning towards an action game, a ninja setting would've been convenient. "The hero would be derived from a ninja. We loosely decided on that." Regarding Hiryu's three robot helpers, he said that he was inspired by the 1960s ninja comics (the one that most influenced him was Shirato Sanpei's Kamui Gaiden), in which the ninja often had various animals to support them or attack their enemies. Speaking with Retro Gamer, Yotsui said that Strider Hiryu's climbing abilities were inspired by his personal experience when he got himself stranded on the roof of Capcom’s building; fearing freezing to death and with no way to call for help, he climbed down the side of the building to reach a nearby fire escape stairway.

A Capcom artist known as Harumaru redesigned the character for Strider 2, inspired by American comics he had found at a bookshelf of the Design Office (among them DC Comics, Mike Mignola, Simon Bisley, and Spawn by Todd McFarlane). In 2014's Strider Hiryu's scarf serves as a visual cue for the Cypher upgrade the player is using (Reflect, Explosive, Cold, Magnetic), changing colors accordingly.

Appearances

Strider Hiryu manga
The manga Strider Hiryu by Tatsumi Wada and Tetsuo Shiba was serialized in the monthly magazine Comic Computique from May to October 1988, spanning six issues. During this time, there were already two Strider games in development. A single volume collection was later published on November 10, 1989. A short prequel story, titled , was published following the completion of the main series and is not included in the collected edition.

The manga is set in the year 2048 and centers around Hiryu, a young Special A-Class rank Strider who retired early during his career after he was forced to kill his elder sister Mariya, a Strider who went insane (as shown in the prequel story). The main series begins with Hiryu living peacefully in Mongolia when his former superior, Vice Director Matic, forces him out of retirement in order to kill his best friend Cain, who has been captured by hostiles in the Kazakh SSR and has become a liability to the rest of the Striders. With the help of Strider Sheena, Hiryu manages to rescue and extract Cain, but he attacks them after regaining consciousness. Hiryu manage to subdue Cain, but not before Sheena is mortally wounded and dies. Hiryu uncovers a small device implanted under Cain's neck and learns that he has been the subject of a mind-control weapon codenamed Zain and that Hiryu's sister Mariya was under the influence of Zain when she went rogue. After Cain regains his sense and freewill, he decides to make amends for Sheena's death by teaming up with Hiryu and stop the Zain project from reaching its completion. The two learn that an organization known simply as the "Enterprise" is behind the Zain project and that Matic himself was cooperating with the Enterprise leader Faceas Clay. With the help of Cain, Strider Chief Kuramoto, and a group of other Striders, Hiryu manages to thwart Matic and Clay, and destroy the main Zain terminal.

Strider video games
Two video game versions of Strider were produced following the publication of the manga. The NES version of Strider, released a few months after the arcade version, adapts the storyline of the Strider Hiryu manga, although a few changes were made to the presentation of the plot. However, the Strider coin-operated arcade game follows a completely different storyline, sharing only a few common elements such as Hiryu himself and the use of Kazakh SSR as the game's initial setting. In this game, Hiryu is hired by a rebel organization to assassinate the Grandmaster, an alien dictator who has gained control of all of the world's military. Hiryu's mission takes him not only to Kazakh, but also to Siberia and the Amazon, as well as the Grandmaster's flying battleship "Balrog". Eventually Hiryu travels to the Grandmaster's lair, the "Third Moon" space station, for the final battle against him.

Hiryu also stars in the second arcade game in the series, titled Strider 2 (released in 1999, almost ten years after the first game). In it, the Grandmaster has returned to life and has reconquered the Earth, and so Hiryu must once again fight against the Grandmaster and his minions, as well as Hien, a former Strider and Hiryu's rival.

An earlier, uncanonical Strider sequel has been released by British game publisher U.S. Gold years prior to Capcom's version of Strider 2. Titled Strider II in Europe and Journey from Darkness: Strider Returns in North America, the game was released for various European home computers in 1990 and remade for Sega consoles in 1992. In Strider II, however, the main character, while implied to be the same Strider from the original game, is addressed as "Hinjo" in the instruction manual for the Sega Genesis version. In this game, Hinjo must save a young woman, the leader of planet Magenta (whose name is Lexia according to the console versions) from a terrorist group (led by the Grandmaster himself in the console versions, who originally did not appear in the game's computer versions).

A new Strider game developed by Double Helix, was announced by Capcom in July 2013, and was released for the PlayStation 3, PlayStation 4, Xbox One, Xbox 360 and Microsoft Windows on February 18, 2014.

Other appearances

Hiryu is also a playable character in the tactical role-playing game Namco × Capcom (2005) and in the crossover fighting games Marvel vs. Capcom: Clash of Super Heroes (1998), Marvel vs. Capcom 2: New Age of Heroes (2000), Ultimate Marvel vs. Capcom 3 (2011), and Marvel vs. Capcom: Infinite (2017), where he is one of many characters representing the Capcom universe. His ending in the first Marvel vs. Capcom game is an homage to the ending in the original Strider. He was also supposed to appear in the cancelled arcade game Capcom Fighting All-Stars. A remake/reboot of the Strider series by Grin was being developed in 2009, but was ultimately cancelled. He appears as a playable character in Project X Zone 2, partnered with Hotsuma from SEGA's Shinobi series.

In addition, Hiryu has made multiple cameo appearances in other Capcom games, including in the Game Boy version of Hatena Hatena no Daibōken, in the arcade quiz game Capcom World 2, in the fighting game Street Fighter Alpha 2 (as a spectator in Ken's home stage), and in the action game Mega Man Legends. He is also featured in various cards in SNK's Card Fighters series (co-produced with Capcom), as well as in cards in Street Fighter x All Capcom and Dragon's Dogma Quest. Hiryu's action figure was produced by ToyBiz in 1999, and a garage kit figure of him was manufactured by Chemical Reaction in 2008.

The Strider Hiryu Visual Chronicle, the first official artbook released for the Strider series, compiling artwork from the arcade Strider, Strider 2 and Strider (2014), as well as art from the unreleased Famicom Strider and Hiryu's main crossover appearances was released in February 2014 at the same time as the 2014 game as part of the Strider Hiryu Special-A Class Limited Edition package, along with other items, including the Strider Hiryu Sound Chronicle, a soundtrack compilation of the Strider series, a 3-CD set compiling the entire soundtrack from the arcade Strider, Strider 2 and Strider (2014).

In Street Fighter V, Guy's master, Zeku, can transform into a younger version of himself that bears a strong resemblance to Strider Hiryu in both looks and attire. In his story mode, he begins a new ninja clan and ponders "Striders" being a possible name, hinting that he is the founder of the Strider clan that Hiryu becomes a part of.

The Strider series was added to the mobile video game Teppen with its March 2021 expansion titled "A Dark Agenda".

Reception
{{quote box|quote=[I]t was lead character Strider Hiryu who proved to be the real stand out. In addition to featuring an impressive number of frames of animation, he was easily the most athletic video game character around. Strider could nimbly climb up walls like a monkey, cartwheel majestically  through the air, run down mountainsides, hang off and move along the undersides of platforms and even--in one of Strider'''s most impressive stages--defy gravity. He may not have been the first ninja to appear in a video game, but no ninja before him ever moved with his sense of deadly grace and purpose. He could seemingly do the impossible, and everything from leaping across giant chasms to simply sliding across the ground exuded a coolness that no other hero at the time could match.|source= Darran Jones, Retro Gamer|width=30%}}

The character has received positive reception both from critics and the general public. In the Japanese Gamest magazine's "Best 100 games of the Year" in 1989, Hiryu ranked 3rd in the "Best Characters" category. In 2000, Edge opined that "in terms of visual appeal and agility, Strider Hiryu ranks as one of the best characters ever designed." In 2008, GameDaily ranked him as the fourth top Capcom character of all time, noting that he "has become an extremely popular character in Capcom's arsenal," while EGM called him "gaming's most stylish character." That same year, IGN's Travis Fahs noted him "one of Capcom's best loved characters", commenting that "there's no denying the iconic appeal, but for all of his flashy moves and fashion sense, Capcom has never really known what to do with him." Strider Hiryu was one of the 64 characters chosen for the GameSpot's 2009 poll All Time Greatest Game Hero. In 2012, GamesRadar ranked this "somewhat of an enduring classic" as the 59th "most memorable, influential, and badass" protagonist in games, commenting that his "sheer levels of badass cool have seen him endure long past his clichés sell-by date, making him now an archetype rather than a stereotype." In 2013, GamesRadar staff included him among the 30 best characters in the three decades of Capcom's history.

According to Hanuman Welch of Complex, Strider Hiryu and Ryu Hayabusa of the Ninja Gaiden series were the "two ninjas synonymous with both the NES era and enduring all the way to the current generation of consoles." Hiryu defeated Ryu in ScrewAttack's Death Battle show, emerging superior from a comparison of strength, speed and weaponry. In 2010, Game Informer chose Strider Hiryu as one of the 20 Capcom characters they would like to see in a rumored crossover fighting game Namco Vs Capcom, his Namco side equivalent being Taki from the Soulcalibur series. In 2012, Complex included "Capcom vs. Sega" as sixth fighting game crossover they would like to see the most, imagining Hiryu clashing with Sega's classic ninja Joe Musashi from the Shinobi series.

Strider Hiryu has been often featured in the various lists and rankings of top ten video game ninja characters. As such, he was ranked as the seventh top ninja in games by 1UP.com in 2004, even as he "loses a few points for not even trying to be stealthy," and placed fourth on a similar list by ScrewAttack in 2010. Complex declared Strider Hiryu the swiftest ninja in games in their 2012 list, calling him "pretty much the perfect ninja." In Jon Ledford of Sushi Arcade included among the ten best video game "ninjas". In 2010, Retro Gamer rated him as number one "Athlete King" of video games, beating the likes of the Prince, Lara Croft, or Sonic the Hedgehog. In addition, he was also ranked as the third most acrobatic character in video games by Complex'' in 2011, and as the ninth top swordsman in gaming by Cheat Code Central's Shelby Reiche in 2012.

WatchMojo has listed Hiryu at #8 in their list of the top 10 video game mercenaries. The British rapper Tinchy Stryder said his stage name was partly derived from Strider.

See also
 Ninja in popular culture
 List of ninja video games

References

External links
 e-Capcom Strider site

 
Capcom protagonists
Fictional assassins in video games
Fictional Japanese people in video games
Fictional kenjutsuka
Fictional mercenaries in video games
Fictional private military members
Fictional secret agents and spies in video games
Fictional special forces personnel
Fictional swordfighters in video games
Fictional taijutsuka
Male characters in anime and manga
Male characters in video games
Ninja characters in video games
Science fiction video game characters
Video game characters introduced in 1988
Video game superheroes